Berka vor dem Hainich is a municipality in the Wartburgkreis district of Thuringia, Germany.

Nearby is the site of an early historical fortification known as the Alte Burg.

The music theorist Eckehard Kiem (1950–2012) was born in Berka.

References

Wartburgkreis